Beacon Capital Partners is an American real estate investment firm based in Boston, Massachusetts. It was founded in 1998, after Beacon Properties, Inc., Beacon's predecessor, was acquired by EQ Office in a $4 billion transaction. The company focuses on office and life science properties in major markets across the United States, including Boston, Chicago, Denver, Los Angeles, New York City, San Francisco, Seattle and Washington, D.C.  It's European presence formerly included buildings in London, Paris, and Luxemburg.

Select Properties
Notable properties developed or owned by Beacon Capital Partners:

Current
44 Montgomery (San Francisco, CA)
53 State Street (Boston, MA)
190 South LaSalle (Chicago, IL)
575 Fifth Avenue (New York)
600 Congress (Austin, TX)
AMA Plaza (Chicago, IL)
Bank of America Tower (Houston, TX)
Lake Merritt Plaza (Oakland, CA)
Southline Boston (Boston, MA), former headquarters of The Boston Globe
Terrell Place (Washington, D.C.)

Former
 10 Universal City Plaza (Universal City, CA), sold 2006
221 Main Street (San Francisco, CA)
330 Hudson (New York, NY)
 535 Mission Street (San Francisco, CA), sold 2012 
85 Broad Street (New York, NY)
 901 Fifth Avenue (New York, NY), sold 2007  
 Berkeley Building (Boston, MA), sold 2006
 Citigroup Center (Los Angeles, CA), sold 2006
 City Center East (Bellevue, WA), sold 2010
 CityPoint (London, England)
 Columbia Center (Seattle, WA), sold 2015
John Hancock Tower (Boston, MA), sold 2007
 One Beacon Street (Boston, MA), sold 2014
 One Sansome Street (San Francisco, CA), sold 2010
Presidential Tower (Arlington, VA), sold 2019
 Tour First (Paris, France) 
Tysons Metro Center (Tysons, VA), sold 2017
Wells Fargo Center (Denver, CO)
Wells Fargo Center (Seattle, WA), sold 2013

See also
Norman B. Leventhal
Alan M. Leventhal

References

External links
 Official website

Organizations established in 1998
Real estate companies of the United States
Organizations based in Boston